Campanet is a town situated in the northeast of Majorca, Spain, close to Búger, Selva, Escorca, Sa Pobla, and Inca. The population recently reached 2616 inhabitants in 2011. This town is particularly known for its caves and the Fonts Ufanes.

References

Municipalities in Mallorca
Populated places in Mallorca